Matao may refer to:

Places
Matão, a municipality in São Paulo, Brazil
Matao, Burma, a village in Kachin State, Burma
Matao, Chipwi, village in Kachin State, Burma
Kum Ga or Matao, a settlement in Kachin State, Burma

Other uses
Matao Herrera (1984), a mass shooting in San Diego, California, U.S.
 Matao, the ruling caste of the traditional Chamorro people